Deer Isle is a town in Hancock County, Maine, United States. The population was 2,194 at the 2020 census. Notable landmarks in Deer Isle are the Haystack Mountain School of Crafts, Stonington Opera House, and the town's many art galleries.

History

The town was incorporated in 1789, at which time it included the islands of Little Deer Isle, Deer Isle, and Isle au Haut. Deer were abundant on these islands, hence the name. In 1868 Isle au Haut became a separate town. In 1897, the southern third of Deer Isle incorporated as the town of Stonington.

In the 19th century, the granite industry flourished on Deer Isle where its quarries supplied granite for structures such as the Boston Museum of Fine Arts, the Smithsonian Institution, the US Naval Academy, the Manhattan Bridge and at President John F. Kennedy's tomb at Arlington National Cemetery.

In John Steinbeck's Travels with Charley, Deer Isle was a stopping point for the author after the insistence of his literary agent that he visit the cottage of Eleanor Brace, at Dunham's Point. Steinbeck wrote, "One doesn't have to be sensitive to feel the strangeness of Deer Isle".

It was Deer Isle that musician Dan Fogelberg and his wife Jean chose for their final home, and where he died in 2007. This isle was the home town of the dock that was the inspiration for the painter Fairfield Porter. Many small private islands can be found in the waters surrounding Deer Isle. Cabot Lyford, a Maine sculptor, used seven tons of Deer Isle granite to carve one of his best known pieces, "Life Force." "Life Force," which depicts dolphins jumping from the water, stands outside the Regency Hotel in Portland, Maine.

Geography
The town of Deer Isle is one of two communities on the island of Deer Isle, the other being Stonington.

Deer Isle is separated from the mainland by Eggemoggin Reach and may be reached by car via a narrow 1939 suspension bridge bearing the island's name.

Demographics

2010 census
As of the census of 2010, there were 1,975 people, 929 households, and 533 families living in the town. The racial makeup of the town was 98.1% White, 0.2% African American, 0.5% Native American, 0.2% Asian, and 1.0% from two or more races. Hispanic or Latino of any race were 0.5% of the population.

There were 929 households, of which 20.8% had children under the age of 18 living with them, 46.5% were married couples living together, 5.8% had a female householder with no husband present, 5.1% had a male householder with no wife present, and 42.6% were non-families. 35.4% of all households were made up of individuals, and 21.1% had someone living alone who was 65 years of age or older. The average household size was 2.05 and the average family size was 2.61.

The median age in the town was 51.6 years. 16.3% of residents were under the age of 18; 6.8% were between the ages of 18 and 24; 18% were from 25 to 44; 30.8% were from 45 to 64; and 28.2% were 65 years of age or older. The gender makeup of the town was 46.9% male and 53.1% female.

2000 census
As of the census of 2000, there were 1,876 people, 781 households, and 523 families living in the town. Hispanic or Latino of any race were 0.37% of the population.

There were 781 households, of which 29.1% had children under the age of 18 living with them, 57.0% were married couples living together, 5.6% had a female householder with no husband present, and 33.0% were non-families. 28.2% of all households were made up of individuals, and 14.6% had someone living alone who was 65 years of age or older.  The average household size was 2.32 and the average family size was 2.82.

In the town, the population was spread out, with 22.5% of the population under the age of 18, 4.9% from 18 to 24, 23.6% from 25 to 44, 26.5% from 45 to 64, and 22.5% who were 65 years of age or older.  The median age was 44 years. For every 100 females, there were 94.8 males. For every 100 females age 18 and over, there were 88.5 males.

The median income for a household in the town was $32,826, and the median income for a family was $40,714. Males had a median income of $27,008 versus $19,052 for females. The per capita income for the town was $16,875. About 5.9% of families and 8.8% of the population were below the poverty line, including 5.8% of those under age 18 and 11.8% of those age 65 or over.

Notable people 

 Gerald Warner Brace (1901–1978), writer, professor, sailor and boat builder
 Dan Fogelberg (1951–2007), singer and songwriter, composer, multi-instrumentalist
 Buckminster Fuller (1895–1983), architect and inventor
 Robert McCloskey (1914–2003), author and illustrator of children's books
Francis Sumner Merritt (1913–2000), painter, co-founder and first director of Haystack Mountain School of Crafts
 Frederick Law Olmsted (1822–1903), early urban planner and landscape architect
Ronald Hayes Pearson (1924–1996) was an American designer, jeweler, and metalsmith
 Thomas E. Ricks (born 1955), Pulitzer Prize-winning American journalist and author who specializes in the military and national security issues
 Anica Mrose Rissi, author and writer brought up in Deer Isle
 Salome Sellers (1800–1909), last known and documented living person born in the 18th century
 Cynthia Voigt (born 1942), young adults book author

Cultural references

John Steinbeck describes his visit to Deer Isle in the 1962 novel, Travels with Charley. 
Deer Isle is mentioned in Part II, Chapter 8, of Don DeLillo's 1977 novel entitled Players.
 Deer Isle was used in Ken Burns' 1990 PBS documentary series The Civil War as a metaphorical microcosm of a typical Union town during the war.  Its Confederate counterpart was the town of Clarksville, Tennessee.  Throughout the series, the two towns are used to show both the similarities and the differences of everyday life during the years of civil war.  The series mentions that fishing decreased during the war as men went off to fight in the war, while women saved lint and other strategic materials, and that soldiers' relatives were afraid to go to the local post office where casualty lists were posted.
 Deer Isle was used a filming location in the 1993 film The Man Without a Face as the fictional town of Cranesport, Maine.
 A fictional version of Deer Isle was created as a playable map modification for the zombie survival game DayZ.

References

External links
 Town of Deer Isle, Maine
 Chase Emerson Memorial Library
 Deer Isle – Stonington Chamber of Commerce
 Maine's Hidden Treasure, a photo-essay by Thomas R. & Deborah A. Fletcher
 The Island Ad-Vantages, a local newspaper
 Island Heritage Trust, a local land trust
 Aerial photograph of Deer Isle, ca. 1935, from the Maine Memory Network

Towns in Hancock County, Maine
Towns in Maine
Populated coastal places in Maine